Trichodorcadion dubiosum is a species of beetle in the family Cerambycidae. It was described by Stephan von Breuning in 1954. It is known from India.

References

Dorcadiini
Beetles described in 1954